The 1950 West Texas State Buffaloes football team was an American football team that represented West Texas State College (now known as West Texas A&M University) in the Border Conference during the 1950 college football season. In its fourth season under head coach Frank Kimbrough, the team compiled a 10–1 record (6–0 against conference opponents), won the conference championship, defeated Cincinnati in the 1951 Sun Bowl, and outscored all opponents by a total of 386 to 190.

The team averaged 35.1 points per game, ranking fourth among 120 major college programs for the 1950 season. The team also averaged 322.9 rushing yards per game, a figure that remains a program record.

The team was led on offense by a trio of quarterback Gene Mayfield and backs Billy Cross and Charles Wright.  Mayfield was named to the Associated Press Little All-America team. Cross's 1950 average of 9.21 rushing yards per carry also remains a program record. Wright set a school record (later broken) with 1,203 rushing yards.

Schedule

References

West Texas State
West Texas A&M Buffaloes football seasons
Border Conference football champion seasons
Sun Bowl champion seasons
West Texas State Buffaloes football